Cox Hill is a hamlet in the parish of Chacewater (where the 2011 Census population was included), Cornwall, England.

References

Hamlets in Cornwall